This is a chronological list of the battles involving France in the Renaissance.

For earlier and later conflicts, see List of battles involving France. These lists do not include the battles of the French civil wars (as the Wars of Religion, the Fronde, the War in the Vendée) unless a foreign country is involved; this list includes neither the peacekeeping operations (such as Operation Artemis, Opération Licorne) nor the humanitarian missions supported by the French Armed Forces.

The list gives the name, the date, the present-day location of the battles, the French allies and enemies, and the result of these conflicts following this legend:

Charles VIII (1483–1498)

Louis XII (1498–1515)

Francis I (1515–1547)

Henry II (1547–1559)

Francis II (1559–1560)

Charles IX (1560–1574)

Henry III (1574–1589)

Henry IV (1589–1610)

See also
Military history of France
List of wars involving France
French Armed Forces
Deployments of the French military

Renaissance battles

France Renaissance
France Renaissance
Renaissance
battles involving France in the Renaissance